Lousika (Greek: Λουσικά) is a village in Achaea, Greece. It is located 5 km southeast of Kato Achaia, 3 km south of Alissos, and 20 km southwest of Patras. In 2001 Lousika had a population of 454 for the village and 632 for the community, which includes the villages Ypsili Rachi and Spaliaraiika. Lousika was the seat of the former municipality of Olenia. The river Serdini flows through the village.

Population

Persons
Stamatios Douvos, (1983-), writer, philosopher, historian
Nikolaos Kontopoulos, (1889–1958 in Athens), writer

External links
 Village's Site
 Lousika GTP Travel Pages

See also
List of settlements in Achaea

References

Olenia
Populated places in Achaea